The men's 1500 metres event at the 1981 Summer Universiade was held at the Stadionul Naţional in Bucharest on 21 and 22 July 1981.

Medalists

Results

Heats

Final

References

Athletics at the 1981 Summer Universiade
1981